Ishqi-Mari or Ishgi-Mari ( iš11-gi4-ma-rí), previously read Lamgi-Mari, was a King of the second Mariote kingdom who reigned c. 2350-2330 BCE. He is one of three Mari kings known from archaeology, Ikun-Shamash probably being the oldest one. The third king is Iku-Shamagan, also known from an inscribed statue.

In their inscriptions, these Mari kings used a dialect of the Akkadian language, whereas their Sumerian contemporaries to the south used the Sumerian language.

It is thought that Ishqi-Mari was the last king of Mari before the conquest and the destruction of Mari by the Akkadian Empire under Sargon circa 2330 BCE.

Inscriptions
Ishqi-Mari is known from a statue with inscription. The statue is in the Aleppo National Museum. The inscription on the back of the statue reads:

This inscription was instrumental in identifying Tell Hariri with the Mari of antiquity.

Several cylinder seals with intricate designs in the name of "Ishqi-Mari, King of Mari" are also known.

Discovery (23 January 1934)

The statue of Ishqi-Mari was discovered buried in the archaeological remains of the ancient city of Mari, in the Temple of Ishtar, by a French archaeological team led by André Parrot on 23 January 1934.

The statue shows Ishqi-Mari with a long beard and parted and plaited hair. He wears a hairbun similar to the Sumerian royal hairbuns, such as on the headdress of Meskalamdug or reliefs on Eannatum. He wears a fringed coat leaving one shoulder bare, a type of clothing also seen on contemporary Akkadian Empire depictions of rulers.

In Aleppo museum

References

Kings of Mari
24th-century BC rulers
24th-century BC people